Scission  may refer to:
 Scission (chemistry), bond cleavage, the splitting of chemical bonds
 Chain scission, the degradation of a polymer main chain
 Beta scission, reaction in thermal cracking of hydrocarbons
 Scission and Other Stories, a 1985 collection of short stories
 Instruction scission, opcode overlapping in computing

See also 
 Scission (a cut-out piece), term involved in development of senses of word "sect"